Virgibacillus dokdonensis is a Gram-variable, endospore-forming, and slightly halophilic bacterium from the genus of Virgibacillus which has been isolated from sea water from the Liancourt Rocks in Korea.

References

Bacillaceae
Bacteria described in 2005